Einar Riegelhuth Koren (born 12 November 1984) is a Norwegian handball player, currently playing for FCK Håndbold. He started his club career in Runar, and has also played for Haslum. He made his debut on the Norwegian national team in 2006, and has played 7 matches and scored 12 goals. On 25 June 2011, Einar Sand Koren married Linn Kristin Riegelhuth, and changed his name to Einar Riegelhuth Koren.

References

1984 births
Living people
Norwegian male handball players